This is a list of members of the Senate of Belgium during the 55th legislature (2019–2024).

Grouping Presidents

List 

 Stephanie D'Hose (President of the Senate)
 Carina Van Cauter
Karl Vanlouwe

References 

2010s in Belgium
2020s in Belgium
21st-century Belgian politicians
2019 establishments in Belgium
Belgium
Lists of members of the Senate (Belgium)